Quercus stenophylloides, also called Arisan oak, is a species of evergreen, broad-leaf tree endemic to Taiwan. It is placed in Quercus subgenus Cerris, section Cyclobalanopsis.

Description 
Quercus stenophylloides can grow up to 15 m(49 ft) tall, with trunks up to 40 cm(16 in) wide. They have gray branchlets with lenticels.

Leaf 
Leaf shape can range from lanceolate to ovate-oblong, 6 - 14.5 cm(2.4 - 5.7 in) long, 1.2 - 4.2 cm(0.5 - 1.7 in) wide, acuminate at apex, and acute or obtuse at base.

They are green on the upside,  grayish-white, glaucous or green and hairy beneath.

The texture is coriaceous. Echinate-serrate on the edge. Midribs are concave above, elevated beneath. Lateral veins 9 - 17 pairs. Petioles 1 - 2.3 cm(0.4 - 0.9 in) long.

Flower 
Blooming from May to June, the flowers are unisexual and are both small, hairy, growing on the same individual tree.

Both are arranged on a stem, only staminate flowers' are a lot longer. Also, staminate flowers are  arranged spirally on a slim drooping stem — this is called catkins.

Staminate catkins are about 5 cm(2 in) long; Staminate flowers are about 3.5 mm(0.14 in) long;  4 - 6 perianths, lobed, hairy outside, glabrous inside;  4 - 9 stamens, filaments 2.5 mm(0.1 in) long, anthers 1 mm(0.04 in) long.

Pistillate flowers are 2 mm(0.08 in) long, and 3.5 mm(0.14 in) wide;  3 - 4 perianths, lobed, hairy,  3 - 4 styles, curved.

Fruit 
Fruits are maturing from October to November. They are first green, then brown and fall to the ground when mature. The cupules are 0.9 - 1.2 cm(0.4 - 0.5 in) long, 1.3 - 1.5 cm(0.5 - 0.6 in) across, scales in 8 - 9 concentric rings, tomentose, margins of rim dentate-serrate; nuts ellipsoid, 1.7 - 2.1 cm(0.7 - 0.8 in) long, 1.2–1.6 cm(0.5 - 0.6 in) across.

Distribution 
They are commonly seen in mountains at the altitude of 900 – 2600 m throughout the Taiwan island.

References

stenophylloides
Endemic flora of Taiwan
Plants described in 1914